Larry Moss may refer to:

 Larry Moss (artist) (born 1970), American artist who works mainly with latex balloons
 Larry Moss (acting coach), actor and acting coach
 Larry Moss (24 character)
 Larry Moss (logician and mathematician)